Koindu is a town in Kailahun District in the Eastern Province of Sierra Leone. Koindu should not be confused with Koidu, which is a major diamond mining town in Kono District and market center. The population of Koindu is estimated at 16,751. Koindu lies approximately 63 miles from Kenema and about 230 miles east of Freetown.
 
The population of Koindu is largely from the Kissi ethnic group.

Picture

Notable people 
 Sahr Senesie, German football star
 Dr. Paul T. Yillia, research scholar at the International Institute for Applied Systems Analysis, Austria

Notes

Populated places in Sierra Leone
Eastern Province, Sierra Leone